The Hills Times is an English-language daily newspaper published in Diphu, Assam, India. It was founded in the year 2000. It is the first English newspaper published in then undemarcated Karbi Anglong district.  This made the newspaper popular among different communities and ages. The newspaper is published in Diphu and printed from Diphu and Guwahati simultaneously.
The present editor is Rameswar Chauhan.

See also 
 Thekar
 The Arleng Daily

References

External links
 
 Anglong Mass Media Communication pen ale kelong (Karbi language)

English-language newspapers published in India
Publications established in 2000
Karbi Anglong district